Mazaaq Raat (Urdu/Punjabi) is a Pakistani television stand-up comedy and talk show hosted by Vasay Chaudhry on Dunya TV. Vasay Chaudhry hosts the show, with the Mazaaq Raati team consisting of Qaiser Pia, Akram Udaas, Iftikhar Thakur, Rukhma Maryam, and Aoun Ali Khan. Veteran Actor Noman Ijaz hosted the show from 2013 to 2015

Cast
Host
 Vasay Chaudhary 2015–present
 Noman Ejaz (2013–15)
Artists
 Iftikhar Thakur 2013
 Qaiser Piya 2016
 Akram Udas 2017
 Amanullah Khan (2013–17)
 Sakhawat Naz (2013–2016)
Co-Host
 Rukhma Maryam 2021–present
 Hibba Waqar (2018–2020)
 Hina Niazi (2017–18)
 Aima Baig (2015–17)
 Samia Khan (2013–2015)
DJ
 Aoun Ali Khan (2019–)
 Mohsin Abbas Haider (2013–19)

List of episodes

2014

2015

2016

2017

2018

2019

References

External links
 Mazaq Raat (official website)

Dunya News original programming
Urdu-language television shows
Pakistani television series
2013 Pakistani television series debuts